CRY 104.0FM is an Irish radio station based in Youghal, County Cork.

Areas served by the station include Youghal, Ballymacoda, Ballycotton, Killeagh, Inch, Ardmore, Clashmore, Aglish and Knockanore.

History 
Having operated as a "pirate" station from 1979 to 1988, CRY was granted a community broadcasting licence in 1995 to cover Youghal's surrounding areas in East Cork and West Waterford. It was one of a very limited number nationwide of what were initially trial community licences, and followed political lobbying in the early 1990s for the station to return with a licence. The appointment of Youghal native Christy Cooney to the then Independent Radio and Television Commission (IRTC), was a significant move in the process to get C.R.Y. back on the air with a community radio licence.

CRY reappeared on the airwaves in September 1995 on 105.1FM, originally with weekday broadcasting hours of 14:00 to 18:00.

The scheduled included the "Youghal in Focus" show, a 90-minute news and current affairs show, which on Mondays and Fridays signed off at 17:00 for the sports programme "Sportsline". Hourly local news bulletins also ran on weekdays for the station's first three years on air, compiled by locally based journalists.

A weekend service originally ran from 09:00 to 14:00, but within six months, weekend hours had been extended to 21:00 to take in live sport, and a relay of Saturday evening Mass.

The station broadcast for many years on its original frequency, but was moved to 107.2FM in 2002 to facilitate the launch of county-wide pop station Red FM, and then switched to 104.0 MHz in late 2006 after suffering interference in outlying areas from a new national station, Newstalk.

The changeover was completed in January 2007, after a short period of simulcasting on both the new and old frequencies, but the station went off air in October 2007 due to maintenance work on the landmark building that CRY occupies, and returned just after Christmas.

CRY broadcasts 24 hours a day on the 104fm wavelength and on its website

Former presenters 
Former broadcasters on CRY who have moved onto national broadcasting include Derek Kiely, Will Downing and Oisin Langan while Thomas Breathnach moved to South Africa to work with Cape Town station Heart 104.9 and now is a travel correspondent, writing for The Boston Globe, Men's Health and Irish Independent.

References

External links
Cry104fm.com
"Tour de France in Youghal" schedule, 1998

Radio stations in the Republic of Ireland
Mass media in County Cork
Former pirate radio stations
Community radio stations in Ireland

Radio stations established in 1979 
Radio stations established in 1995 
Radio stations disestablished in 1988